Paulina Singer (born September 5, 1991) is an American actress, known for her roles as Grace Bledsoe on We TV's horror drama series South of Hell and Jessie Tyler on Freeform's teen drama series Dead of Summer.

Early life
Singer was born and raised in Exeter, New Hampshire. Her father is African American and her mother is of Ukrainian descent. She studied for a year at Eugene Lang College The New School for Liberal Arts in New York City before dropping out to pursue an acting career. At 19, Singer joined the Upright Citizens Brigade to study improvisational theatre.

Career
In 2014, Singer was cast in musician Russ's music video for the song Gypsy. In 2015, Singer was cast in a main role in the We TV horror drama series South of Hell, executive produced by Eli Roth and Jason Blum. She portrayed Grace Bledsoe, alongside Mena Suvari and Bill Irwin. The following year, she joined the regular cast of Freeform's teen drama-thriller series Dead of Summer, portraying summer camp counselor Jessie Tyler. In 2017, she portrayed the lead role of Kelley Winters in the Lifetime television film High School Lover, alongside James Franco, Lana Condor, and Julia Jones. In 2018, she starred in Stella's Last Weekend, alongside Nat Wolff and Alex Wolff.

Filmography

Film

Television

References

External links
 

1991 births
21st-century American actresses
Actresses from New Hampshire
African-American actresses
American film actresses
American television actresses
American people of Ukrainian descent
Eugene Lang College alumni
Living people
People from Exeter, New Hampshire
21st-century African-American women
21st-century African-American people